
The Sutra of Filial Piety (or Sutra on the Profundity of Filial Love, Sutra on Parental Benevolence) is an apocryphal sutra composed in China and apparently an exercise in Buddhist apologetics. It is claimed to have been translated by the monk Kumārajīva.

The text attempts to synthesise native Confucian ideals with Buddhist teachings and was probably produced by Chinese Buddhist monks in imitation of the Confucian Classic of Filial Piety. The sutra seeks to refute Confucian criticism that Buddhism's traditionally monastic focus undermines the virtue of filial piety.

The sutra is still highly popular in China and Japan and in the latter is sometimes used as a focus in Naikan-type introspection practices.

See also 
 Filial piety in Buddhism

References

Further reading 
  Ch'en, Kenneth (1968). Filial Piety in Chinese Buddhism, Harvard Journal of Asiatic Studies 28, 81-97

External links 
The Filial Piety Sutra The Deep Kindness of Parents & Difficulty in Repaying It
A translation of one version of the Sutra

Chinese literature
Buddhism in China